Mind Eraser may refer to:
 Mind Eraser (roller coaster), a suspended looping roller coaster at several parks
 The Mind Eraser (Geauga Lake), a Flying Cobra boomerang roller coaster
 "Mind Eraser", a song by The Black Keys from the 2011 album El Camino
 "Mind Eraser", a 2018 single by CRUISR
 "Mind Eraser, No Chaser", a 2009 song by Them Crooked Vultures
 Mind Eraser, an variation of the Black Russian cocktail